Verkhnyaya Dobrinka is a rural locality (a selo) and the administrative center of Verkhnedobrinskoye Rural Settlement, Zhirnovsky District, Volgograd Oblast, Russia. The population was 716 as of 2010. There are 21 streets.

Geography 
Verkhnyaya Dobrinka is located 71 km southeast of Zhirnovsk (the district's administrative centre) by road. Vishnyovoye is the nearest rural locality.

References 

Rural localities in Zhirnovsky District
Kamyshinsky Uyezd